The Adagio and Rondo, K. 617, is a quintet composed by Wolfgang Amadeus Mozart for glass harmonica, flute, oboe, viola and cello. Completed on May 23, 1791 (the date indicated in Mozart's own list of his works), it was written for Marianne Kirchgessner, a blind glass harmonica virtuoso, who played the first performance in the Burgtheater Akademie on June 10, 1791, and subsequently performed it at the Kärtnertortheater on August 19, 1791. 

The autograph manuscript is in the British Library as part of the Stefan Zweig Collection. It was purchased by Zweig from a Berlin auction house in 1930. 

The work was first published by Breitkopf & Härtel in 1799.

The adagio, in C minor, is 58 bars long, while the rondo (C major) contains 230 bars.

According to Willi Apel, "Among various compositions for the glass harmonica, Mozart's Adagio in C major (K. 356) and Adagio and Rondo (K. 617)...both composed in 1791, are the most interesting. They seem to require an instrument equipped with a keyboard mechanism such as that constructed in 1784."

References

Sources

External links

Zweig MS 61 (digitized manuscript from the British Library)

Chamber music by Wolfgang Amadeus Mozart
Compositions in C minor
Compositions in C major
1791 compositions
Stefan Zweig Collection